The Banks Lake National Wildlife Refuge is a 4,049 acre (16.4 km²) National Wildlife Refuge located in Lanier County, Georgia. Banks Lake is a natural pocosin or sink of ancient geologic origin. The refuge was established in 1985 for the protection and conservation of this unique environment as well as migratory and resident wildlife.

An estimated 20,000 people visit the refuge each year. There is no dedicated budget or staff for the refuge; it is administered completely by the Okefenokee National Wildlife Refuge.

History

Banks Lake is a natural pocosin or mill pond probably created by tidal action of the ocean and shaped by a more temperate climate thousands of years ago.

In the mid-19th century, Joshua Lee built a low-level dam across the drainage creek on his property and utilized the impounded running water to power a grist mill to grind corn, wheat, and rice. The impounded lake and accompanying mill established the area as a trade center along the early stagecoach route between Waresboro, Georgia and Thomasville, Georgia.

In the 1920s, the E.D. Rivers family attempted to develop the area around the lake for electric power and land development.

In the 1970s, the E.D. Rivers Estate threatened to drain the lake and harvest the "lightered stumps" and cypress trees.

The Nature Conservancy purchased the land from the E.D. Rivers Estate on March 14, 1980. In April, 1980, the United States Fish and Wildlife Service entered into a lease agreement with The Nature Conservancy for management and operation of Banks Lake. On February 22, 1985, the U.S. Fish and Wildlife Service purchased Banks Lake from The Nature Conservancy and redesignated it as the Banks Lake National Wildlife Refuge.

Topography
Banks Lake is a natural pocosin probably created by tidal action of the ocean and shaped by a more temperate climate thousands of years ago. Of the 4,049 acres (16.4 km²), approximately 1,000 acres (4 km²) is open water. The remainder consists of marsh, hardwood swamp, and uplands.

Facilities
Fishing is permitted year-round on the lake in accordance with Georgia State fishing laws. Sportfish most caught include largemouth bass, chain pickerel, crappie, bluegill, warmouth perch, flier, and catfish.

A short walking trail, boardwalk and platform are provided for wildlife viewing opportunities

A concession, the Banks Lake Outdoors, rents canoes and kayaks and sells fishing and hunting licenses, bait and tackle, gifts, and snacks.

See also
List of National Wildlife Refuges

External links

Banks Lake National Wildlife Refuge homepage
FWS profile of Banks Lake  NWR
Recreation.gov overview

Protected areas of Lanier County, Georgia
National Wildlife Refuges in Georgia (U.S. state)
Protected areas established in 1985
Wetlands of Georgia (U.S. state)
Landforms of Lanier County, Georgia
1985 establishments in Georgia (U.S. state)
Bodies of water of Lanier County, Georgia